The Lusalira–Nkonge–Lumegere–Sembabule Road is a road in the Central Region of Uganda, connecting the town of Lusalira, in Mubende District, to the town of Sembabule in Sembabule District. Through this road, traffic can connect from Mubende to Sembabule and then on to Masaka, in southwestern Uganda.

Location

Upgrade to class II bitumen
In 2018, the Government of Uganda (GOU), through the Uganda National Roads Authority (UNRA), began making arrangements to upgrade this road to class II bitumen, with shoulders, culverts and drainage channels. The work includes (a) grade-separated intersections (b) underpasses and related structures (c) signal lights and (d) side walls. In April 2022, UNRA indicated that the next stage of development was contract signing with an entity called Tecnovia Joint Venture. In February 2022, the executive director of UNRA, Allen Kagina, while releasing the half year performance report for the financial year 2021/2022, indicated that this road is a priority.

Funding
As of July 2018, the construction cost had not yet been made public. The Exim Bank of China and UK Export Finance had indicated willingness to provide loans for this project. The GOU was expected to make an equity investment into the upgrade of this road. As of that time, selection of an engineering, procurement and construction (EPC) contractor was ongoing.

See also
 List of roads in Uganda

References

External links
 Website of Uganda National Roads Authority
 Oil roads are now a priority and will be ready by 2025- UNRA boss Kagina As of 1 March 2022.

Roads in Uganda
Mubende District
Sembabule District
Transport in Uganda